Lawn bowls at the 1988 Summer Paralympics consisted of six events, five for men and one for women.

Medal summary

References 

 

1988 Summer Paralympics events
1988
Paralympics